Palatine Chapel  may refer to:
Belgium
Gravenkapel in Kortrijk

Germany
Palatine Chapel, Aachen

Italy
 in the Palace of Broletto, Brescia
 in the Palace of Caserta
 in the Royal Palace of Naples
Cappella Palatina in Palermo, Sicily

See also
Royal chapel (disambiguation)
Palatine